Alf Cox (1919–2008) was an Australian rugby league footballer who played in the 1940s.

Playing career
Alf Bunga Cox was the St. George first grade halfback during the war years (1942-1945) along with Alby McAndrew. He missed his chance in playing in the 1942 Grand Final due to a broken collarbone injury that was sustained on 8 August 1942 in the last game of the season against Easts.

Cox retired from first grade in 1946.

Death
Cox died on 7 May 2008 at Mortdale, New South Wales, age 88.

References

St. George Dragons players
Australian rugby league players
1919 births
2008 deaths
Rugby league players from Sydney
Rugby league five-eighths
Rugby league halfbacks